Salvador Rodríguez may refer to:

 Salvador Rodríguez (mayor), mayor of San Antonio, Texas, in 1785 and 1796
 Salvador Rodríguez (regidor), regidor of San Antonio, Texas
 Salvador Becerra Rodríguez (born 1946), Mexican politician
 Salvador Rodríguez (athlete) (born 1980), Spanish sprinter